Jeffrey Ntuka (10 May 1985 – 21 January 2012) was a South African footballer who played at both professional and international levels as a defender.

Career

Club career
Born in Kroonstad, Free State, Ntuka joined English club Chelsea in 2003 and spent five years on loan at Belgium club Westerlo, making 93 league appearances for them. Ntuka returned to South Africa in 2009, making his debut for Kaizer Chiefs in May 2009. After battling alcohol problems, Ntuka later played for SuperSport United. He was released by United in 2011.

International career
Ntuka earned five caps for South Africa between 2004 and 2007.  He made his debut on 18 August 2004 in a 2–0 win over Tunisia coming in for Nasief Morris in the 88th minute. Ntuka was a member of South Africa's squad at the 2005 COSAFA Cup, but had to withdraw due to injury. He played his last match on 27 May 2006.

Death
Ntuka was stabbed to death in Kroonstad during the early hours of 21 January 2012. His killer, April Jao, was sentenced to 12 years imprisonment in November 2013.

References

1985 births
2012 deaths
South African soccer players
South Africa international soccer players
Chelsea F.C. players
K.V.C. Westerlo players
Kaizer Chiefs F.C. players
SuperSport United F.C. players
South African expatriate soccer players
Expatriate footballers in England
Expatriate footballers in Belgium
Association football defenders
Male murder victims
People murdered in South Africa
South African murder victims
People from Kroonstad
Deaths by stabbing in South Africa
Soccer players from the Free State (province)